Karim agha Shakikhanov (pen-name Fateh) was an Azerbaijani poet and historian.

Biography 
He was born in 1788 to Fatali Khan and Khurshid khanum from Quba in Shaki, Shaki Khanate. He received private education in palace, had an excellent command of Arabic and Persian languages. He was described as a pious person by Firidun bey Kocharli and was included in his major academic work entitled Topics on the History of Azerbaijani Literature. He wrote mostly in Persian and alongside his native Azerbaijani.

Works 

 Diwan — Now lost. Probably in Persian language.
 Ghazal dedicated to Prophet Muhammad.
 Ghazal in Azerbaijani.
 Brief History of Shaki Khans — written in Azerbaijani, included in Bernhard Dorn's "Excerpts from Muhammedan writers" in 1858. However he mistakenly attributed the book to some certain Haji Abdullatif Afandi, while Azerbaijani poet Salman Mumtaz concluded that in fact it was Karim Shakikhanov's work. It was republished in 1958, this time under the name of Karim agha. According to Azerbaijani historian Adalat Tahirzada, book might be commissioned by Ivan Paskevich - Russian general in Caucasus.

Family 
He had 4 sons (Abdulhamid, Mustafa, Ismail, Jafar and Gullu khanum and 1 daughter), some were buried in Shaki Khan's Mosque:

References 

19th-century Azerbaijani historians
Azerbaijani-language poets
Shaki Khanate
1788 births
1858 deaths